Julius Chepkwony (born 6 June 1969) is a Kenyan sprinter. He competed in the 4 × 400 metres relay at the 1996 Summer Olympics and the 2000 Summer Olympics.

References

1969 births
Living people
Athletes (track and field) at the 1996 Summer Olympics
Athletes (track and field) at the 2000 Summer Olympics
Kenyan male sprinters
Olympic athletes of Kenya
Place of birth missing (living people)
African Games medalists in athletics (track and field)
African Games bronze medalists for Kenya
Athletes (track and field) at the 1999 All-Africa Games